Paskuh Rural District may refer to:
 Paskuh Rural District (Sistan and Baluchestan Province)
 Paskuh Rural District (South Khorasan Province)

See also
 Pasakuh Rural District